Miguel de los Santos may refer to:
 Miguel de los Santos Álvarez (1817–1892), Spanish writer
 Miguel de los Santos (athlete), competitor for Spain at the 1996 Summer Olympics
 Miguel de los Santos (broadcaster) (born 1936), commentator for Spain in the Eurovision Song Contest

See also
 Miguel Santos (disambiguation), multiple people